Ulrich Moroder (born October 4, 1948, in Ortisei in Val Gardena) is an Italian artist from South Tyrol.

Biography 
In 1974 Moroder received training at the University of Applied Arts in Vienna (O. Oberhuber, A. Frohner). In 1976 he went to Provence. In 1978 he attended the Academie de la Grande Chaumiere in Paris. From 1980 to 1987 he had several study visits to New York and Los Angeles and from 1988 to 1993 in Rome. He is a brother of Giorgio Moroder. Ulrich worked during his vocational apprenticeship and trained as a barrel painter in Ortisei.
Moroder played ice hockey from 1968 to 1969 for the team HC Gherdëina, participating and winning the Serie A tournament. He currently lives and works in Vienna and Ortisei.

Exhibitions and works 
Moroder has had exhibitions in Austria, Italy, Germany, the United States and France. The artist also used to be part of the South Tyrolean Artists Association.
Some works of the artist have been sold to the City of Vienna, the Federal Ministry for Education and Cultural Affairs, the Museion Bozen, and to the Ferdinandeum in Innsbruck.

External links 
 Website von Ulrich Moroder
 chamäleon - DAS ZETT-MAGAZIN
 L zënter culturel Tublà da Nives

References 

20th-century Italian male artists
21st-century Italian male artists
Italian ice hockey players
Ladin people
People from Urtijëi
1948 births
Living people
Moroder family
Italian contemporary artists
Germanophone Italian people